NGC 5562 is a spiral galaxy (class S) in the constellation of Boötes.

References

External links 
 

Boötes
5562
Spiral galaxies
009174
051227